The Shaoxing China Textile City Sports Centre Stadium is a multi-purpose, retractable roof stadium in Shaoxing, Zhejiang, China. It was opened in 2014 for the 2014 Provincial Games of Zhejiang. It became the home stadium of China League One side Zhejiang Yiteng in 2016.

References

Football venues in China
Athletics (track and field) venues in China
Sports venues in Zhejiang
Multi-purpose stadiums in China